Elena Vladimirovna Osipova (born 11 November 1927 in Moscow - died 2018) is a Russian philosopher and sociologist.

Education and career 
Elena Osipova graduated from the Lomonosov University in 1950, where she went on to obtain a candidate degree in 1954. For her candidate degree, she performed research in the philosophy of Enlightenment in Poland. In 1974, she successfully defended her thesis “Sociology of Émile Durkheim” and became a Doctor of Sciences. She led research at the Institute of Philosophy of the Russian Academy of Sciences. Her publications have to do mainly with the history of Western sociology, the problems of power, and the question of the relationship between personality and society.

Membership in learned societies 
Elena Osipova has been a full member of the Russian Academy of Social Sciences since 1995.

Bibliography 
 Осипова, Елена Владимировна // Осипов Г.В. (общ. ред.) Российская социологическая энциклопедия (Russian Sociological Encyclopaedia). М., Норма-Инфра-М, —1998. — 672 с. (Page 355)
 Осипова, Елена Владимировна // Большая биографическая энциклопедия (Great Biographical Encyclopaedia)

References

External links 
 Elena Osipova's page at the website of the RAS Institute of Philosophy 

1927 births
2018 deaths
Soviet sociologists
Soviet philosophers